Primark Town Center is engaged in the development of Public Market and Town Center of LKY Group, one of the Philippines' largest land developers. The management is handled by Philippine Primark Properties, Inc., and headed by Wilbert T. Lee as the company's president and CEO.

Etymology 
Primark is a combination of words "Primary" and "Market". The name is in line to the company's vision by providing prime retail facilities and in providing the basic and primary needs of the community.

History 

The company was established since 1996 as LKY Prime Builders Inc, a company under LKY Group that offers construction services and real-estate development. Eleven years later, they engaged in mall business with an investment of PhP 1.2 B as their initial public offering (IPO). The Securities and Exchange Commission (SEC) gave them a go signal and proceed with their mall expansion to 12 community malls in the county at their first year. Their mall expansion started with their first mall opened in Cabiao, Nueva Ecija on November 28, 2014, followed by Echague, Isabela in April 2015. It then grew with three branches in Sorsogon City in which one of those was bought from the defunct Sorsogon Shopping Center, to the cities of Cauayan and Tuguegarao in Cagayan provinces, Binmaley, Pangasinan, Antipolo and Teresa in Rizal and Muñoz, Nueva Ecija. Primark's major tenants to these branches were SM Savemore Market, Ace Hardware, BDO and Chinabank and McDonald's, and they plan to have them on their future malls.

On their initial investment of PhP 1.2 B, About PhP 867 M gone to the construction of their first 12 malls in 2015. The remains will be for their future sites across the country.

In early 2016, Primark announced their first malls in Visayas and Mindanao. Tacloban will be Primark's first in the Visayas while Tacurong will be their first in Mindanao following their purchase to the Tacurong's MS Store.

Currently, the operations and management Primark Town Centers are handled by the Philippine Primark Properties Inc., with LKY Group as their parent company.

Branches

Existing Branches

Future Branches

See also 
 CityMall

External links

References 

Retail companies of the Philippines
Shopping center management firms
Real estate companies established in 1996
Retail companies established in 1996
1996 establishments in the Philippines
Philippine brands
Companies based in San Juan, Metro Manila